Bodil Branner  (born 5 February 1943, in Aarhus) is a retired Danish mathematician, one of the founders of European Women in Mathematics and a former chair of the Danish Mathematical Society. Her research concerned holomorphic dynamics and the history of mathematics.

Education and career
Branner studied mathematics and physics at Aarhus University, where mathematician Svend Bundgaard was one of her mentors, and in 1967 earned a master's degree (the highest degree then available) under the supervision of Leif Kristensen. She had intended to travel to the U.S. for a doctorate, but her husband, a chemist, took an industry job in Copenhagen. Branner could not get a job as a high school teacher because she did not have a teaching qualification, but Bundgaard found her a position as a faculty assistant for Bent Fabricius-Bjerre at the Technical University of Denmark. Despite this not beginning as an actual faculty position, she eventually earned tenure there in the 1970s. She was the first woman to chair the Danish Mathematical Society, from 1998 to 2002. She retired in 2008.

Recognition
A symposium in honor of Branner's 60th birthday was held in Holbæk in 2003, and published as a festschrift in 2006. In 2012, she became one of the inaugural fellows of the American Mathematical Society.

Selected publications
.
.
.
.

References

External links

Living people
20th-century Danish mathematicians
21st-century Danish  mathematicians
Aarhus University alumni
Academic staff of the Technical University of Denmark
Fellows of the American Mathematical Society
1943 births
People from Aarhus
20th-century women mathematicians
21st-century women mathematicians